Frederic F. Clairmont was a Canadian economist and essayist specializes in economic history and geopolitics. He was educated in Montreal at McGill University and worked for the United Nations. He died in 2021.

He is the author of the books The Rise & Fall of Economic Liberalism: The Making of the Economic Gulag (1996), Cuba and Venezuela: The Nemeses of Imperialism (2007), Prospects of war and peace (2009), BP: The Unfinished Plunder and Crimes of Anglo-American Imperialism (2010), Venezuela: The Embattled Future (2011)  et Globalization, The Purgatory of Delusions: Reflections on Imperial Pathology (2012). He has published several articles in Le Monde diplomatique.

References

20th-century Canadian essayists
20th-century Canadian economists
Living people
20th-century Canadian male writers
21st-century Canadian essayists
21st-century Canadian male writers
Canadian male essayists
Year of birth missing (living people)